Quelle drôle de gosse! (aka: Mad Girl) is a 1935 French comedy drama film directed by Léo Joannon and written by Yves Mirande. The music score is by Jean Lenoir and Georges van Parys. It tells the story of a young secretary who falls in love with a wealthy young man, after unrequited love with her boss.

Cast
Albert Préjean as Gaston Villaret 
Danielle Darrieux as  Lucie 
Lucien Baroux as Laquais 
Suzanne Desprès as Georgette 
André Roanne as Paul

See also
Sweet Devil (1938)

External links

Quelle drôle de gosse! at fan-de-cinema.com

French black-and-white films
1935 films
Films directed by Léo Joannon
French comedy-drama films
1935 comedy-drama films
1930s French films